The Samyang 35mm F1.4 AS UMC is an interchangeable moderate wide angle prime lens for cameras with full frame or smaller sensor. It was announced by Samyang on September 16, 2010.

References

035
Camera lenses introduced in 2010